The discography of Fun Lovin' Criminals encompasses six studio albums, a live album, seven compilation albums, an EP, sixteen singles and three video albums.

Studio albums

Live albums

Compilation albums

Extended plays

Singles

Notes

Videos
Love Ya Back - A Video Collection (2001, DVD-V, EMI/Chrysalis)
The Bong Remains The Same (2003, DVD, Mita Media)
Come Find Yourself (Live In Berlin) - 20th Anniversary (2007, DVD, DiFontaine)

References

 
Hip hop discographies
Rock music discographies
Discographies of American artists